Jadwiga Falkowska codename: Jaga, Zdzisława, Ludwika, Zaleska (November 13, 1889 in Tver, Russia – August 7, 1944 in Warsaw, Poland) was a Polish teacher, social activist, Scoutmaster (harcmistrzyni) and one of the founders of Girl Scouting in Poland.

During the Second World War she was in the resistance. Jadwiga was murdered by RONA units during the Warsaw Uprising.

Awards
 Order of Polonia Restituta
 Gold Cross of Merit (Krzyż Zasługi)
 Cross of Valour (Krzyż Walecznych)
 Armia Krajowa Cross (Krzyż Armii Krajowej)

Works
 "Czym są sprawności?" (wstęp do książki „Sprawności harcerek”);
 "Dzieje żeńskich kursów instruktorskich"
 "Konferencje programowe instruktorek na tle rozwoju harcerskiej myśli wychowawczej"
 "Rzut oka na rozwój Harcerstwa Żeńskiego w Polsce"
 "Skautki polskie - zarys organizacyjny" (together with Kazimierz Wyrzykowski, Andrzej Małkowski and Emilia Czechwiczówna).

Bibliography
 Anna Zawadzka „Gawędy o tych, które przewodziły”

External links
 Jaga Falkowska – Harcmistrzyni Rzeczypospolitej at jaga.harc.pl

1889 births
1944 deaths
People from Tver
Polish schoolteachers
Polish civilians killed in World War II
Polish women in World War II resistance
Polish Scouts and Guides
Recipients of the Order of Polonia Restituta
Recipients of the Gold Cross of Merit (Poland)
Recipients of the Cross of Valour (Poland)
Recipients of the Armia Krajowa Cross
Polish women in war
Polish female soldiers
20th-century Polish women
Warsaw Ghetto Uprising insurgents